Robert Garcia may refer to:

People
Robert Garcia (California politician) (born 1977), United States Representative from California; Mayor of Long Beach, California
Robert Garcia (New York politician) (1933–2017), United States Representative from New York
Robert Garcia (American boxer) (born 1975), boxing trainer and former IBF Super Featherweight Champion
Robert Garcia (squash player) (born 1986), Filipino squash player
Bobbito Garcia (Robert Garcia, born 1966), Puerto Rican-American DJ, writer, and broadcaster

Fictional characters
Robert Garcia (Art of Fighting), a video game character from the SNK series Art of Fighting and The King of Fighters
Robbie Garcia, a character from the TV series 6teen

See also
Roberto García (disambiguation)